Krishna Teja Junior College was founded in 2003 by C.V.S. Krishnamurthy Teja Charities.

Location 
The institute is at Tirupati-Renigunta Highway in Tirupati of Chittoor District in Andhra Pradesh, 150 km from Chennai City and 250 km from Bangalore City.

Krishna Teja Public School, Krishna Teja Pharmacy College, Degree College, and Dental College are also on this campus.

Courses 
The college offers courses such as:
M.P.C Maths, Physics, Chemistry
Bi.P.C Biology, Physics, Chemistry
C.E.C Civics, Economics, Commerce
M.E.C Maths, Economics, Commerce

References 

Colleges in Andhra Pradesh
Universities and colleges in Tirupati
Educational institutions established in 2003
2003 establishments in Andhra Pradesh
Junior colleges in India